A city is generally an urban settlement with a large population.

City or Cities may also refer to:

Literature and publications
City (novel), a 1952 novel by Clifford D. Simak
City (magazine), a Finnish magazine
City: Magazine International, a former French magazine
The City (website), a New York City based non-profit digital news startup founded in 2018
City (newspaper), an Italian free daily newspaper
City Newspaper, a free alternative weekly in Rochester, New York, USA
"The City" (short story), a short story by Ray Bradbury
Al-Balad (“The City”), the ninetieth sura of the Qur’an
City (manga), a 2016 Japanese manga series by Keiichi Arawi
City (journal), a journal of urban trends, culture, theory, policy and action
Cities (journal), a journal of current and historical urban development and management

Music

Albums
City (Client album), 2004
City (Jane Siberry album), 2001
City (Strapping Young Lad album), 1997
City (Chengshi) Chinese album by Deserts Chang 2009
Cities (Anberlin album), 2007
Cities (The Cat Empire album), 2006

Bands and musicians
City (band), a German rock band
The City (band), an American alternative rock band of the 1980s
The City, a trio formed by Carole King in 1968

Songs
"City", a song by Hollywood Undead from Swan Songs
"City", a song by Sara Bareilles from Little Voice
"Cities" (song), a 1980 song by Talking Heads
"Cities", a 2014 song by Nat & Alex Wolff
"Cities", a song by Beck for the video game Sound Shapes
"City", a 2020 song by Ai Furihata
"The City", a song by Fleetwood Mac from Mystery To Me

Places

Australia
City, Australian Capital Territory, the central business district of Canberra, Australia

Switzerland
City (Zürich), an area of the Altstadt district of Zürich, Switzerland

United Kingdom
City, Powys, a hamlet in Powys, Wales, in the United Kingdom
City, Vale of Glamorgan, a village in the Vale of Glamorgan, Wales
City of London, the historic core and chief financial district of London, more usually termed "The City" but sometimes written on maps as "City"

Television
City (TV series), a 1990 TV series starring Valerie Harper
Citytv, a Canadian television network owned and operated by Rogers Communications previously named City
CITY-DT, a Toronto television station owned-and-operated by Rogers Media

Transportation
 City Airline, a former Swedish regional airline
 Honda City, a Japanese subcompact car
 Think City, a Swedish electric microcar

Other uses
City (artwork), a 1972 piece of earth art by Michael Heizer located in the U.S. state of Nevada
City (typeface), a slab-serif typeface designed by Georg Trump
City Interactive, a Polish video game publisher
Manchester City F.C., a football club sometimes referred to as "City"

See also

The City (disambiguation)
 Citi (disambiguation)
 Citti (surname)

ca:City